Ypthima rhodesiana, the pale ringlet or Zambian ringlet, is a butterfly in the family Nymphalidae found in Africa.

It is found along the coast of Kenya and in the southern part of the Democratic Republic of the Congo, central and western Tanzania, Zambia, and northern Zimbabwe.

The habitat consists of Brachystegia woodland and wooded savanna.

References

rhodesiana
Butterflies of Africa
Lepidoptera of the Democratic Republic of the Congo
Lepidoptera of Tanzania
Lepidoptera of Zambia
Insects of Zimbabwe
Butterflies described in 1961